Madhavapeddi Satyam (11 March 1922 – 18 December 2000) was an Indian playback singer and actor who predominantly worked in Telugu cinema.

He entered films as a singer-actor in Y. V. Rao's Tamil-Hindi bilingual movie Ramadas in the year 1946, playing the role of Kabir. However, he became more popular as a playback singer due to his booming voice. His voice suited artists like S. V. Ranga Rao, Relangi and Ramana Reddy. He also sang for others like Akkineni Nageswara Rao, N.T. Rama Rao, Jaggayya and Padmanabham.

In a five-decade long career, he sang numerable songs including popular ones like "Vivaha Bhojanambu" from the film Mayabazar (1957) for S. V. Ranga Rao, and "Ayyayyo Chethilo Dabbulu Poyene" from the film Kulagothralu (1961) for Ramana Reddy. Satyam is also a close relative of Madhavapeddi Suresh, famous music composer in 1990s Telugu films.

Biography
Madhavapeddi Satyam was born on 11 March 1922 at Brahmanakoduru village in Ponnur, Andhra Pradesh. He is the son of Sri Madhavapeddi Lakshmi Narasayya and Late Smt. Sundaramma. Satyam is a close relative of Madhavapeddi Suresh, a famous music composer in the 1990s.

From his childhood he showed talent for singing and acting in dramas, inspiration being his paternal uncle Sri Madhavapeddi Venkatramayya, a well noted dramatist. He started portraying different roles in drama and one of them "Chalo Delhi" a social drama in which his singing, acting and music calibre was brought out for the first time in Madras (now Chennai). Spotted by director-producer Y.V. Rao in 1946, Satyam was fortunate to get an opportunity to act as Kabir in Y.V. Rao's film Ramadas and singing three songs in this bilingual film in Tamil and Hindi under the musical supervision of C.R. Subbaraman.

Immediately followed his entry into the Telugu film industry with his first Telugu song "Manasu Gaadha Khudha Thodai..." with Sri Ghantasala for the film Laila Majnu in the year 1949. He sang for S. V. Ranga Rao in Mayabazar and it was well received by audience.

He died in Chennai on 18 December 2000, at the age of 78.

Filmography

Playback Singer

Actor

Madhavapeddi Satyam Award
Madhavapeddi Satyam's son, Madhavapeddi Murthy, a Kuchipudi exponent, instituted the Madhavapeddi Awards. Some of the film personalities who have received this award include:
 M.S. Viswanathan
 P. B. Sreenivas

References

External links
 

1922 births
2000 deaths
Telugu male actors
Telugu playback singers
20th-century Indian male actors
Male actors from Andhra Pradesh
Indian male film actors
Indian male playback singers
20th-century Indian singers
People from Guntur district
Indian male stage actors
Male actors in Telugu cinema
Singers from Madhya Pradesh
20th-century Indian male singers